Salim Yusuf  (born 26 November 1952) is an Indian-born Canadian physician, the Marion W. Burke Chair in Cardiovascular Disease at McMaster University Medical School. He is a cardiologist and epidemiologist.

Early life and education
Born in the town of Kottarakkara in Kerala, Yusuf studied medicine at St. John's Medical College in Bangalore and earned a DPhil at Oxford University as a Rhodes scholar. At Oxford, he also took part in research into cardiovascular disease.

His doctoral thesis was titled "Beta adrenergic blockade in myocardial infarction" and his supervisor was Peter Sleight.

Career
In 1984, Yusuf moved to the National Institutes of Health in the United States, where he led clinical trials that showed the value of ACE inhibitors in people with left ventricular dysfunction and the optimal use of digoxin). He came to the Michael G. DeGroote School of Medicine at McMaster University in 1992 as director of the cardiology division. In 1999 McMaster created the Population Health Research Institute at the Hamilton Health Sciences campus of McMaster, and made Yusuf the director of the center and vice president of research at HHS.

From 1999 to 2004, he also held an appointment as a senior scientist at the Canadian Institutes of Health Research.

In 2011, he was the world's second-most cited cardiology researcher. and in 2020, he was the most-cited scientist in the world in cardiology. Yusuf's large-scale clinical trials have had a significant impact on the treatment and prevention of cardiovascular and cerebrovascular disease. in particular, he has demonstrated the value of combinations of blood pressure lowering and lipid lowering with statins and of combinations of antiplatelet therapy and joint use of anticoagulants and aspirin in low doses to prevent cardiovascular disease and death.

He was president of the World Congress of Cardiology in 2015 and 2016, where he initiated the Emerging Leaders Program that mentors 25 people form around the world to undertake research into improving cardiovascular health. In its first 6 years, the program has trained 150 people from about 50 countries.

Dietary views

Yusuf disputes the guidelines on saturated fat and dietary sodium intake. In 2017, Yusuf spoke at the Cardiology Update 2017 symposium in which he disputed the saturated fat guidelines whilst admitting he is not an expert in nutrition. He stated that a higher saturated fat intake is protective and eating more dietary carbohydrates is harmful. Yusuf has commented that "saturated fats are not harmful, may even be slightly beneficial but there is no harm", and recommends people to consume high-fat dairy products and unprocessed red meat. These ideas were criticized by other medical researchers and nutritionists as bizarre and misguided.

Yusuf has questioned the consensus on salt and cardiovascular disease and has argued that a low sodium intake does not lower risk of cardiovascular events and mortality but increases it. In 2018, he co-authored a controversial paper which argued that sodium intake is associated with cardiovascular disease only in communities where mean intake is greater than 5 g/day. The paper disputes the salt guidelines of the World Health Organization who recommend that populations consume less than 2 g/day as a preventive measure against cardiovascular disease. The paper was widely criticized by the medical community with the American Heart Association strongly disputing the study as flawed and offering no credible evidence.

Honours
In 2013, Yusuf was named an Officer in the Order of Canada. He is also a fellow of the Royal Society of Canada. In 2014, he was awarded the Canada Gairdner Wightman Award and was inducted into the Canadian Medical Hall of Fame.
In November 2020 he received the McLaughlin medal of the Royal Society of Canada and in 2022 he received the Killam prize. He has received over 60 national and international prizes or awards and 4 honorary doctorates.

References

External links
 Full text of doctoral thesis via Oxford Research Archive

1952 births
Living people
Canadian cardiologists
Officers of the Order of Canada
Fellows of the Royal Society of Canada
Indian Rhodes Scholars
Indian emigrants to Canada